is a city in eastern Toyama Prefecture, Japan. , the city had an estimated population of 33,045 in 12674 households  and a population density of 605 persons per km2. The coast of Namerikawa is the habitat of the world famous glowing , which surface yearly in a phenomenon that has been designated a Special Natural Monument by the Japanese government. The city was founded on March 1, 1954.

Geography
Namerikawa is in northeastern Toyama Prefecture, in the Hayatsuki river delta and is bordered by the Sea of Japan (Toyama Bay) to the northwest. Namerikawa is located 1 hour by air (via Toyama Airport), 3 hours by rail and 5 hours by car from Tokyo. Since March 2015, rail access is possible via Hokuriku Shinkansen high-speed train from nearby Toyama. The city area is formed on the alluvial fan between the Hayatsuki River and the Kamiichi River. Namerikawa has a humid continental climate (Köppen Cfa) characterized by mild summers and cold winters with heavy snowfall.  The average annual temperature in Namerikawa is 13.9 °C. The average annual rainfall is 2317 mm with September as the wettest month. The temperatures are highest on average in August, at around 26.4 °C, and lowest in January, at around 2.6 °C.

Surrounding municipalities
Toyama Prefecture
 Toyama
 Uozu
 Kamiichi

Demographics
Per Japanese census data, the population of Namerikawa has remained relatively steady over the past 50 years.

History
The area of present-day Namerikawa was part of ancient Etchū Province. During the Heian period, much of the area was part of  shōen controlled by  Yasaka Shrine in Kyoto. During the Edo period it was part of the territory controlled by the Maeda clan of Kaga Domain. The town of Namerkawa was created within Nakaniikawa District, Toyama with the establishment of the modern municipalities system on April 1, 1889. On November 1, 1953, Namerigawa merged with the neighboring villages of Nakakazumi, Higashikazumi, Nishikazumi, Kitakazumi, Hamakazumi and Hayatsukikazumi. It was raised to city status on March 1, 1954.

Government
Namerikawa has a mayor-council form of government with a directly elected mayor and a unicameral city legislature of 15 members.

Economy
Once a rural town in the overlooking Toyama bay, then prospering as inn town on the Hokuriku Kaidō, Namerikawa has developed as an industrial city and commercial center, and is increasingly a bedroom community for nearby Uozu.

Education
Namekawa has seven public elementary schools and two public junior high schools operated by the town government, and one public high school operated by the Toyama Prefectural Board of Education.

Transportation

Railway
 Ainokaze Toyama Railway
 -
 Toyama Chihō Railway
 -  -  -  -  -  -  -

Highway
Hokuriku Expressway

Local attractions
 To promote firefly-squid-themed eco-tourism and education, the world's only firefly squid museum opened in March 1998.

Sister cities
Namerikawa has several sister cities:
 - Komoro, Nagano (1974)
 - Toyokoro, Hokkaidō (1984)
 - Nasushiobara, Tochigi (1996)
 - Schaumburg, Illinois, United States (1997)

References

External links 

  
 

 
Cities in Toyama Prefecture
Populated coastal places in Japan